The Chief of the Indonesian National Police, commonly known as the National Police Chief, is the official who heads the Indonesian National Police (Polri).

Since it was first formed, this position has experienced several changes in hierarchy and position names. In the Old Order era, this position had undergone several name changes (such as Men/Pangak, or Minister/Commander of the Police Force as then-member of the cabinet) and in the New Order era the position of the Chief of Police in a hierarchy was under the ABRI Commander.

History
On 19 August 1945 the Preparatory Committee for Indonesian Independence (PPKI) formed the National Police Agency (BKN). On 29 September 1945 President Sukarno appointed Raden Said Soekanto Tjokrodiatmodjo to become the Chief of the National Police (KKN).

Initially the police were within the Ministry of Internal Affairs under the name Djawatan National Police which was only responsible for administrative matters, while operational issues were accountable to the Attorney General.

Starting from 1 July 1946 with the Government Determination in 1946 No. 11 / S.D. Djawatan National Police which is directly responsible to the Prime Minister.

In the country of the United States of Indonesia, the Bureau of State Police of the United States of Indonesia was under the Prime Minister through the mediation of the Attorney General in the political and operational fields. Meanwhile, in terms of maintenance and administrative arrangements, the Minister of Home Affairs is responsible. The United States of Indonesia President Sukarno on 21 January 1950 reappointed Soekanto Tjokrodiatmodjo as Chief of the Bureau of Police of the United States of Indonesia. After RIS broke up, Soekanto was reappointed as Head of the Indonesian Police Service Bureau.

In 1961 the State Police became part of the armed forces. In 1962 the position of head of the police department was changed to Minister / Head of State Police, and was changed again to Minister / Chief of Staff of the National Police Force. During the Dwikora Cabinet the position of National Police Chief was changed to become Minister / Commander-in-Chief of the Police Force.

After the reorganization of ABRI in 1970, it again became the Head of the Indonesian National Police (Kapolri), which was under the command of the Commander of the Armed Forces of the Republic of Indonesia (ABRI Commander).

Since 1 April 1999, the Indonesian National Police were separated from the Indonesian Armed Forces from ABRI and became independent. Upon election, the President could receive recommendation nominees from National Police Commission (Kompolnas) and send his/her preferred candidate(s) to the House of Representatives for approval. Nominees are usually active three-star police generals (Commissioner General rank, such as Chief of Investigation Body, Vice Chief of National Police, Chief of Terrorism Eradication Body, etc.) 

The National Police Chief is elected by the President based on the approval of the House of Representatives and is directly responsible to the President.

List of holders

See also
Indonesian National Police

References

Chiefs of police